Jiang Xin (born 8 May 1983), also known by her English name Rulu Jiang, is a Chinese actress.

Life and career
Jiang Xin entered Zhengzhou City's Children Arts Group at the age of 7 and Henan Children Arts Group at the age of 8. At the age of 9, Jiang began acting in television series. She later graduated from the Henan Vocational College of Art with a major in performance.

Jiang first became known after starring in Zhang Jizhong's 2003 television adaption of Demi-Gods and Semi-Devils. She also played supporting roles in the hit fantasy dramas Chinese Paladin (2005) and Happy 7 Fairies (2005). However over the next few years, none of her roles resonated with the audience, and Jiang remained relatively unknown.

Jiang rose to fame in 2012 for her role as Consort Hua in the critically acclaimed historical drama, Empresses in the Palace. One of her lines in the series,  "Jian ren jiu shi jiao qing", which literally means "bitches are hypocrites", was particularly popular and went viral on the internet. Jiang won the Best Supporting Actress Award at the 2012 China TV Drama Awards.

Jiang then teamed up with veteran actors Chen Baoguo, Ma Yuanzheng and Niu Lin in the literacy period drama The Old Farmers (2014), playing a selfish and scheming village woman. Her performance earned her one nomination for Best Supporting Actress at the Shanghai Television Festival.

In 2015, Jiang starred in the fantasy romance drama Hua Xu Yin : City of Desperate Love, a television depiction of the fictional universe Novoland. Her portrayal of the proud and valiant heroine earned her the Best Actress award in the ancient drama genre at the Huading Awards. The same year, she featured in the hit dramas The Journey of Flower and The Legend of Mi Yue.

In 2016, Jiang co-starred in the metropolitan romance drama, Ode to Joy, which depicts the stories of five young women who comes from different social and educational backgrounds, but share a common goal. The series was a critical and commercial success, and Jiang received positive reviews for her portrayal of Fan Shengmei, an insecure and realistic career woman. She was nominated as Best Actress at the Huading Awards and Magnolia Awards. She reprised her role in the season 2 of the television series, which started airing in 2017.

In 2017, Jiang made her big-screen debut in the comedy film Super Teacher.

Jiang entered Forbes China Celebrity 100 list for the first time in 2017, ranking 56.

Filmography

Film

Television series

Discography

Singles

Awards and nominations

References

External links

Living people
1983 births
Actresses from Xinjiang
Hui actresses
People from Ürümqi
21st-century Chinese actresses
Chinese television actresses
Actresses from Zhengzhou